The perioperative period is the time period of a patient's surgical procedure. It commonly includes ward admission, anesthesia, surgery, and recovery. Perioperative may refer to the three phases of surgery: preoperative, intraoperative, and postoperative, though it is a term most often used for the first and third of these only - a term which is often specifically utilized to imply 'around' the time of the surgery. The primary concern of perioperative care is to provide better conditions for patients before operation (sometimes construed as during operation) and after operation.

Perioperative care 
Perioperative care is the care that is given before and after surgery. It takes place in hospitals, in surgical centers attached to hospitals, in freestanding surgical centers, or health care providers' offices. This period is used to prepare the patient both physically and psychologically for the surgical procedure and after surgery. For emergency surgeries this period can be short and the patient may be oblivious to this; for elective surgeries 'preops', as they are called, can be quite lengthy. Information obtained during preoperative assessment is used to create a care plan for the patient.

Findings from a systematic review of perioperative advance care planning suggest the importance and value that various types of decision aids have for patients to clarify their goals and specify others who can make decisions for them in case of unexpected surgical difficulties.

Phases

Preoperative 
The preoperative phase is used to perform tests, attempt to limit preoperational anxiety and may include the preoperative fasting.

Intraoperative 
The intraoperative period begins when the patient is transferred to the operating room table and ends with the transfer of a patient to the Post Anesthesia Care Unit (PACU). During this period the patient is monitored, anesthetized, prepped, and draped, and the operation is performed. Nursing activities during this period focus on safety, infection prevention, opening additional sterile supplies to the field if needed and documenting applicable segments of the intraoperative report in the patients Electronic Health Record. Intraoperative radiation therapy and Intraoperative blood salvage may also be performed during this time.

Postoperative 
The postoperative period begins after the transfer to the Post Anesthesia Care Unit (PACU) and terminates with the resolution of the surgical sequelae. It is quite common for the last of this period to end outside of the care of the surgical team. It is uncommon to provide extended care past the discharge of the patient from the PACU.

See also
Pre-anesthesia checkup

References

External links 
 AORN - Association of periOperative Registered Nurses
 AfPP - Association for Perioperative Practice
 Evidence Based Perioperative Medicine

Surgery